St. Clairsville is a city in and the county seat of Belmont County, Ohio, United States. The population was 5,096 at the 2020 census. It is part of the Wheeling metropolitan area.

History
The seat of justice of Belmont County was originally known as Newellstown, and under the latter name was laid out in the late 1790s by David Newell.  The name of the settlement was soon changed to St. Clairsville in honor of Northwest Territory Governor and Revolutionary War Major-General Arthur St. Clair.

In 1833, St. Clairsville contained a brick courthouse and jail, five houses of worship, seventeen or eighteen mercantile stores, several groceries, a drug store, a book store, five taverns, three printing offices, four or five physicians, and fourteen or fifteen lawyers, and a large number of mechanics' shops. CBS's well known Charles Kuralt's program..."On the Road With Charles Kuralt" drove through Saint Clairsville for a TV segment, in the 1960s.

Belmont County was also the venue for the world-famous Jamboree in the Hills outdoor country music festival.  In 1986, the syndicated Paul Harvey show featured a special election being held in Belmont County for purposes of Selecting a new official county seal and flag, created by then county resident Michael A Massa.

Geography
St. Clairsville is located at  (40.079379, -80.901274).
The Official Belmont County Seal, designed by county native Michael A. Massa, features 13 stars, denoting that the county was the 13th parcel to have originally been incorporated into what was the US Northwest Territory.

Demographics

2010 census
As of the census of 2010, there were 5,184 people, 2,386 households, and 1,407 families living in the city. The racial makeup of the city was 94.7% White, 2.8% African American, 0.1% Native American, 1.0% Asian, 0.3% from other races, and 1.2% from two or more races. Hispanic or Latino of any race were 0.7% of the population.

There were 2,386 households, of which 22.2% had children under the age of 18 living with them, 46.4% were married couples living together, 9.5% had a female householder with no husband present, 3.1% had a male householder with no wife present, and 41.0% were non-families. 37.3% of all households were made up of individuals, and 20.4% had someone living alone who was 65 years of age or older. The average household size was 2.10 and the average family size was 2.74.

The median age in the city was 49.7 years. 17.7% of residents were under the age of 18; 6.1% were between the ages of 18 and 24; 20.2% were from 25 to 44; 30.1% were from 45 to 64; and 25.8% were 65 years of age or older. The gender makeup of the city was 45.9% male and 54.1% female.

2000 census
As of the census of 2000, there were 5,057 people, 2,262 households, and 1,431 families living in the city. The population density was 2,354.2 people per square mile (908.1/km). There were 2,430 housing units at an average density of 1,131.2 per square mile (436.4/km). The racial makeup of the city was 94.48% White, 3.08% African American, 0.04% Native American, 1.36% Asian, 0.04% Pacific Islander, 0.16% from other races, and 0.83% from two or more races. Hispanic or Latino of any race were 0.47% of the population.

There were 2,262 households, out of which 24.8% had children under the age of 18 living with them, 52.8% were married couples living together, 8.0% had a female householder with no husband present, and 36.7% were non-families. 33.7% of all households were made up of individuals, and 18.4% had someone living alone who was 65 years of age or older. The average household size was 2.18 and the average family size was 2.78.

In the city the population was spread out, with 19.8% under the age of 18, 5.6% from 18 to 24, 23.1% from 25 to 44, 27.6% from 45 to 64, and 23.9% who were 65 years of age or older. The median age was 46 years. For every 100 females, there were 82.9 males. For every 100 females age 18 and over, there were 78.0 males.

The median income for a household in the city was $36,630, and the median income for a family was $47,808. Males had a median income of $40,597 versus $25,229 for females. The per capita income for the city was $23,416. About 4.2% of families and 6.7% of the population were below the poverty line, including 11.0% of those under age 18 and 5.4% of those age 65 or over.

Education

Public schools
St. Clairsville is currently home to St. Clairsville High School, Middle School, and Elementary School. The St. Clairsville mascot is a Red Devil.  The mascot has been a point of contention due to concern over satanic overtones, but in fact references a nickname for local coal miners.  The miners would emerge covered in a red dust due to the red clay present at a local mine in an area dubbed Hell's Kitchen.  The school system serves grades Pre-K to 12.

St. Mary's Central School

Located in town is St. Mary's School which includes grades Pre-school through 8th. Their mascot is the Knights.  St. Mary's School was a feeder school into the now closed St. John Central High located in Bellaire, Ohio. The school is of the Roman Catholic affiliation.

Colleges
 Ohio University Eastern Campus
 Belmont College

Attractions and Economy
The main shopping district is centered on the Ohio Valley Mall, which opened in 1978.

The Bike Path features a  gazebo, two nature trails, two tunnels, a Wheeling & Lake Erie original railroad bridge, and countless scouts projects. The National Road Bikeway in St. Clairsville is the only bike trail in Ohio with a rail tunnel.

The city owns and intends to redevelop the Clarendon Hotel. Built in 1890, it lies along the National Road, a National Scenic Byway.

Murray Energy is based in St. Clairsville.

Transportation
St. Clairsville lays along both Interstate 70 and U.S. Route 40 (the latter of which runs roughly parallel to the former National Road). The town is also served by Ohio State Route 9, and Interstate 470 has its western terminus nearby.

St. Clairsville is home to Alderman Airport, a private airport. The nearest general aviation airport is Wheeling Ohio County Airport, and the nearest major commercial airport is Pittsburgh International Airport.

Notable people
 Sylvester Antolak - Medal of Honor recipient
 Alice A. W. Cadwallader – philanthropist and temperance activist
 Thomas Eckert - served as Assistant Secretary of War from 1865-1869 under Edwin M. Stanton during Andrew Johnson's presidency. President, Western Union.
 John Jacob Lentz - founder of the American Insurance Union and former member of Congress
 Benjamin Lundy - Quaker anti-slavery leader
 Edmund A. Sargus, Jr. - United States Federal Judge on the United States District Court for the Southern District of Ohio
 Jeremy Sowers - starting pitcher for the Cleveland Indians
 Tim Spencer - Ohio State running back, coach, member of San Diego Chargers
 Charlie Wilson - former U.S. Representative from Ohio's 6th Congressional District
 James E. Carnes - Former Ohio State Senator.

See also 

 St. Clairsville Public Library

References

External links

 City website
 Library

Cities in Ohio
County seats in Ohio
Cities in Belmont County, Ohio
National Road
Populated places established in 1801
1801 establishments in the Northwest Territory